Pen-yr-Orsedd quarry was a slate quarry in the Nantlle Valley in North Wales. It was one of the last slate quarries operating in North Wales and the last operating in the Nantlle Valley area, finally closing in 1979.

History 
Pen-yr-Orsedd opened in 1816, owned by William Turner who was also the owner of the nearby Dorothea quarry and the Diphwys Casson quarry in Blaenau Ffestiniog. It was acquired on 1854 by John Lloyd Jones who sold it on to the Darbishire Company, owners of the Penmaenmawr granite quarries, in 1862. The new owners invested £20,000 to expand the quarry, though with limited results; by 1871 the quarry was producing just 500 tons per year. William Darbishire took over direct management of the quarry that year and by 1882 had raised production to almost 8,000 tons.

Pen-yr-Orsedd was one of the major slate producers of the Nantlle Valley. It was the last of the Nantlle quarries to commercially produce slate, closing in 1979.

Narrow-gauge railway museum 
Railway enthusiast Rich Morris began collecting narrow gauge rolling stock in 1963, storing many at his home in Longfield in Kent. As the collection grew he sought a more permanent arrangement and in 1976, he came to an agreement with the Festiniog Slate Group to move many of his locomotives to Pen-yr-Orsedd, where he planned to set up a museum to exhibit his collection and tell the story of narrow gauge industrial railways.

With the closure of Pen-yr-Orsedd, The Festiniog Group offered Morris space for his collection at their largest quarry, Oakeley. Morris' collection was moved there in May 1978. Further collections were brought to Oakeley and the Narrow Gauge Railway Centre was opened in the Gloddfa Ganol tourist attraction.

Tramways 
In 1862 the quarry was connected to the Nantlle Railway, with  narrow gauge lines extended to all but the highest levels of the quarry. Most levels of the quarry had both  gauge and  gauge trackwork, many with mixed gauge tracks. The Nantlle Railway connection was used up until 1963, while the internal  gauge lines continued in limited use until the end of quarrying.

Locomotives

See also 
 British narrow gauge slate railways

References 

 

Llanllyfni
Slate mines in Gwynedd
1979 disestablishments in Wales
Railway inclines in Wales
Industrial railways in Wales
Railway lines opened in 1862
2 ft gauge railways in Wales
3 ft 6 in gauge railways in Wales
Dyffryn Nantlle